Sergeant Township is a township in McKean County, Pennsylvania, United States. The population was one hundred and forty-six at the time of the 2020 census.

Geography
According to the United States Census Bureau, the township has a total area of 80.3 square miles (208.0 km2), of which 80.3 square miles (207.9 km2) is land and 0.04 square mile (0.1 km2) (0.05%) is water.

Demographics

As of the census of 2000, there were one hundred and seventy-six people, seventy-seven households and fifty-eight families residing in the township. 

The population density was 2.2 people per square mile (0.8/km2). There were three hundred and twenty-nine housing units at an average density of 4.1/sq mi (1.6/km2). 

The racial makeup of the township was 96.02% White, 0.57% African American, and 3.41% from two or more races. Hispanic or Latino of any race were 2.27% of the population.

There were seventy-seven households, out of which 24.7% had children under the age of eighteen living with them; 66.2% were married couples living together, 6.5% had a female householder with no husband present, and 23.4% were non-families. 22.1% of all households were made up of individuals, and 11.7% had someone living alone who was sixty-five years of age or older. The average household size was 2.29 and the average family size was 2.64.

In the township, the population was spread out, with 17.6% under the age of eighteen, 5.1% from eighteen to twenty-four, 22.7% from twenty-five to forty-four, 33.5% from forty-five to sixty-four, and 21.0% who were sixty-five years of age or older. The median age was forty-eight years. 

For every one hundred females, there were 114.6 males. For every one hundred females aged eighteen and over, there were 113.2 males.

The median income for a household in the township was $33,438, and the median income for a family was $37,813. Males had a median income of $33,000 compared with $21,875 for females. The per capita income for the township was $16,063. 

About 6.2% of families and 9.8% of the population were below the poverty line, including 8.5% of those under the age of 18 and 18.4% of those 65 or over.

References

Populated places established in 1809
Townships in McKean County, Pennsylvania
Townships in Pennsylvania